Whole blood (WB) is human blood from a standard blood donation. It is used in the treatment of massive bleeding, in exchange transfusion, and when people donate blood to themselves. One unit of whole blood (~517 mls) brings up hemoglobin levels by about 10 g/L. Cross matching is typically done before the blood is given. It is given by injection into a vein.

Side effects include red blood cell breakdown, high blood potassium, infection, volume overload, lung injury, and allergic reactions such as anaphylaxis. Whole blood is made up of red blood cells, white blood cells, platelets, and blood plasma. It is best within a day of collection; however, can be used for up to three weeks. The blood is typically combined with an anticoagulant and preservative during the collection process.

The first transfusion of whole blood was in 1818; however, common use did not begin until the First and Second World Wars. It is on the World Health Organization's List of Essential Medicines. In the 1980s the cost of whole blood was about US$50 per unit in the United States. Whole blood is not commonly used outside of the developing world and military. It is used to make a number of blood products including packed red blood cells, platelet concentrate, cryoprecipitate, and fresh frozen plasma.

Medical use
Whole blood has similar risks to a transfusion of red blood cells and must be cross-matched to avoid hemolytic transfusion reactions. Most of the reasons for use are the same as those for RBCs, and whole blood is not frequently used in high income countries where packed red blood cells are readily available. However, use of whole blood is much more common in low and middle income countries. Over 40% of blood collected in low-income countries is administered as whole blood, and approximately a third of all blood collected in middle-income countries is administered as whole blood.

Whole blood is sometimes "recreated" from stored red blood cells and fresh frozen plasma (FFP) for neonatal transfusions. This is done to provide a final product with a very specific hematocrit (percentage of red cells) with type O red cells and type AB plasma to minimize the chance of complications.

Transfusion of whole blood is being used in the military setting and is being studied in pre-hospital trauma care and in the setting of massive transfusion in the civilian setting.

Processing
Historically, blood was transfused as whole blood without further processing.  Most blood banks now split the whole blood into two or more components, typically red blood cells and a plasma component such as fresh frozen plasma. Platelets for transfusion can also be prepared from a unit of whole blood.  Some blood banks have replaced this with platelets collected by plateletpheresis because whole blood platelets, sometimes called "random donor" platelets, must be pooled from multiple donors to get enough for an adult therapeutic dose.

The collected blood is generally separated into components by one of three methods.  A centrifuge can be used in a "hard spin" which separates whole blood into plasma and red cells or a "soft spin" which separates it into plasma, buffy coat (used to make platelets), and red blood cells.  The third method is sedimentation: the blood simply sits overnight and the red cells and plasma are separated by gravitational interactions.

Storage
Whole blood is typically stored under the same conditions as red blood cells and can be kept up to 35 days if collected with CPDA-1 storage solution or 21 days with other common storage solutions such as CPD.

If the blood is used to make platelets, it is kept at room temperature until the process is complete.  This must be done quickly to minimize the warm storage of RBCs in the unit.

References

External links
 Blood & Blood Products from U.S. Food and Drug Administration (FDA)

Blood products
World Health Organization essential medicines
Transfusion medicine
Wikipedia medicine articles ready to translate